Sharifa al-Qiyadi (born 1947) is a Libyan novelist and short story writer.

Born in Tripoli, al-Qiyadi received her master's degree in humanities from al-Fatih University in 1981; her thesis was titled Journey of Libyan Women's Writing. Her first volume of short stories appeared two years later; it was followed by numerous others. A novel, This Is Me, appeared in 1997. Her work treats feminist themes; some of it discusses the improved condition of women under the regime of Muammar Gaddafi.

References

1947 births
Living people
Libyan short story writers
Libyan novelists
Libyan women writers
Women short story writers
Women novelists
20th-century short story writers
20th-century novelists
21st-century short story writers
People from Tripoli, Libya
20th-century Libyan writers
21st-century Libyan writers
21st-century Libyan women writers
20th-century Libyan women writers